Yelena Vladimirovna Syuzeva (born 29 June 1987) is a Russian sailor, from Krasnodar, who competed in the 2012 Summer Olympics in the Elliott 6m class with Ekaterina Skudina and Elena Oblova coming 4th overall.

References

External links
 
 
 

1987 births
Living people
Russian female sailors (sport)
Olympic sailors of Russia
Sailors at the 2012 Summer Olympics – Elliott 6m